Damar is a city in Rooks County, Kansas, United States.  As of the 2020 census, the population of the city was 112.

History
Damar was established along the Union Pacific Railroad in 1888 by a community of French Canadians. The community had emigrated from Canada as early as 1871, settling on farms along the Rooks County-Graham County line in northwest Kansas. According to tradition, the community was named after D.M. Marr, the original owner of the town site.

The nearby Enfield Post Office was relocated to Damar in 1894.

St. Joseph Catholic Church was constructed in 1912. The church was listed in the National Register of Historic Places in 2005.

In 1920, Damar had three elevators, two implement dealerships, hardware store, lumber yard, dry goods store, grocery stores, barbershop, bank and opera hall.

The Knights of Columbus built the township hall in 1922.

Geography
Damar is located at  (39.319144, -99.584156).

Climate
The climate in this area is characterized by hot, humid summers and generally mild to cool winters.  According to the Köppen Climate Classification system, Damar has a humid subtropical climate, abbreviated "Cfa" on climate maps.

Demographics

2010 census
As of the census of 2010, there were 132 people, 58 households, and 34 families residing in the city. The racial makeup of the city was 97.7% White, 1.5% Asian, and 0.8% from two or more races.

There were 58 households, of which 29.3% had children under the age of 18 living with them, 51.7% were married couples living together, 3.4% had a female householder with no husband present, 3.4% had a male householder with no wife present, and 41.4% were non-families. 34.5% of all households were made up of individuals, and 18.9% had someone living alone who was 65 years of age or older. The average household size was 2.28 and the average family size was 2.97.

The median age in the city was 50 years. 23.5% of residents were under the age of 18; 7.5% were between the ages of 18 and 24; 14.3% were from 25 to 44; 34% were from 45 to 64; and 20.5% were 65 years of age or older. The gender makeup of the city was 46.2% male and 53.8% female.

2000 census
As of the census of 2000, there were 155 people, 64 households, and 41 families residing in the city. The racial makeup of the city was 96.13% White and 3.87% African American.

There were 64 households, out of which 28.1% had children under the age of 18 living with them, 54.7% were married couples living together, 4.7% had a female householder with no husband present, and 34.4% were non-families. 29.7% of all households were made up of individuals, and 26.6% had someone living alone who was 65 years of age or older. The average household size was 2.42 and the average family size was 3.05.

In the city, the population was spread out, with 29.7% under the age of 18, 5.2% from 18 to 24, 23.9% from 25 to 44, 12.3% from 45 to 64, and 29.0% who were 65 years of age or older. The median age was 40 years. For every 100 females, there were 93.8 males. For every 100 females age 18 and over, there were 81.7 males.

The median income for a household in the city was $27,917, and the median income for a family was $31,563. Males had a median income of $25,625 versus $9,583 for females. The per capita income for the city was $11,796. About 9.3% of families and 7.1% of the population were below the poverty line, including 1.8% of those under the age of eighteen and 4.2% of those 65 or over.

Parks and Recreation
 Webster Reservoir and Webster State Park

Education
The community is served by Palco USD 269 public school district.  It has two schools: Damar Elementary School is located in Damar, Palco Jr-Sr High School is located in Palco.

Damar High School was unified with Palco High School in 1974. The Damar High School mascot was the Antelope.

References

Further reading

External links

 City of Damar
 Damar - Directory of Public Officials, League of Kansas Municipalities
 St. Joseph Catholic Church in Damar
 Damar city map, KDOT

Cities in Rooks County, Kansas
Cities in Kansas
1888 establishments in Kansas
Populated places established in 1888